Laurent Fabre is a French name given to :

 Laurent Fabre (born 1968), a French ski mountaineer
 , a French priest, founder of the Chemin Neuf Community
 , a French drawer whose real name is Laurent Fabre